Deustu (until 2017, Deusto) is a station on lines 1 and 2 of the Bilbao metro. The station is located in the neighbourhood and district of the same name. It is located close to the Bidarte mall and Bilbao's Escuela Oficial de Idiomas (Official Language School). It opened on 11 November 1995.

Station layout 

Deustu station follows the typical cavern-shaped layout of most underground Metro Bilbao stations designed by Norman Foster, with the main hall located directly above the rail tracks.

Access 

  29 Lehendakari Agirre St. (Lehendakari Aguirre exit)
  10 Iruña St. (Iruña exit, closed during night time services)
   12 Iruña St. (Lehendakari Aguirre exit)

Services 
The station is served by line 1 from Etxebarri to Ibarbengoa and Plentzia, and by line 2 from Basauri to Kabiezes.

References

External links
 

Line 1 (Bilbao metro) stations
Line 2 (Bilbao metro) stations
Buildings and structures in Bilbao
Railway stations in Spain opened in 1995
1995 establishments in the Basque Country (autonomous community)